Letha Taung, also known as the Singu Plateau, is a small volcanic plateau in central Burma (Myanmar).

Geography
Letha Taung is located near Nweyon, Singu Township, Pyinoolwin District, Mandalay Division, about 3 km west of National Highway 31. The lavas that form the plateau originally came from fissure vents during the Holocene, although the date of the last eruption is unknown. The active Sagaing Fault, a transform boundary runs under this structure.

See also 
 List of mountains in Burma
 List of volcanoes in Burma

References 

Lava plateaus
Fissure vents
Volcanoes of Myanmar
Mountains of Myanmar
Mandalay Region
Holocene volcanoes